Tanya is the twenty-fourth studio album by American country music artist Tanya Tucker. It was released on September 24, 2002 via her own Tuckertime label and Capitol Nashville.

The highest charting Billboard Country Single was the #34 "A Memory Like I'm Gonna Be." Other noteworthy songs include "Old Weakness (Coming On Strong)," (a minor Billboard #49 Country Single) and "I Can Live Without You (But Not Very Long)" and "I Can Do That." The album peaked at #39 on the Country Albums chart.

Two of this album's tracks — "Old Weakness (Coming On Strong)" and "Over My Shoulder" — were originally recorded by Patty Loveless on her 1994 album When Fallen Angels Fly. The former song was recorded by Delbert McClinton and Greg Holland as well.

Giving it three stars out of five, Jonathan Widran of Allmusic said in his review, "Tucker seems, as always, adept at just about any great story and steel guitar-twanged groove that comes her way."

Track listing

Personnel
Tanya Tucker - lead vocals, backing vocals
Eddie Bayers - drums
Barry Beckett - keyboards, piano
Bekka Bramlett - backing vocals
J. T. Corenflos - electric guitar
Dan Dugmore - pedal steel guitar
Vince Gill - backing vocals
Carl Gorodetzky - string contractor
Aubrey Haynie - mandolin
Beth Hooker - backing vocals on "I Still Hear Your Voice"
Jim Horn - soprano saxophone
Ronn Huff - string arrangements
John Barlow Jarvis - keyboards, piano
Jerry Laseter - electric guitar
Blue Miller - acoustic guitar
John Wesley Ryles - backing vocals
Lisa Silver - backing vocals
Hank Singer - fiddle
Willie Weeks - bass guitar
Dennis Wilson - backing vocals

Chart performance

References

2002 albums
Tanya Tucker albums
Albums produced by Barry Beckett
Capitol Records albums